Soul° Cello (subtitled Modern Jazz Arrangements for Cello and Orchestra) is an album by Fred Katz originally released on Decca in 1958.

Reception

Allmusic gave the album 4 stars.

Track listing
All compositions by Fred Katz except as indicated
 "Country Gardens" (Percy Grainger) - 2:46
 "Satori" - 3:44
 "Andante" (Luther Henderson) - 2:36
 "Circus" (Lou Alter, Bob Russell) - 3:20
 "Wayfaring Stranger" (Traditional) - 2:30
 "Time After Time" (Jule Styne, Sammy Cahn) - 3:51
 "The Vidiot" - 2:05
 "Lament of the Oracles" - 3:49
 "I'm Glad There Is You" (Jimmy Dorsey, Paul Madeira) - 3:09
 "The Toy That Never Was" - 3:33
 "Intermezzo" (Heinz Prevost) - 2:52
 "Come with Me" (William Marx) - 2:50

Personnel
Fred Katz - cello
Paul Horn - flute, clarinet, alto saxophone (tracks 1, 4-7 & 11) 
Buddy Collette - alto saxophone (tracks 1, 4-7 & 11)
Bill Green, Harry Klee - flute (tracks 1, 4-7 & 11)
Calvin Jackson - piano
Ann Stockton - harp
John Pisano - guitar
Hal Gaylor - bass
Chico Hamilton - drums

References

1958 albums
Fred Katz (cellist) albums
Decca Records albums